The 1957–58 Cypriot First Division was the 21st season of the Cypriot top-level football league.

Overview
It was contested by 10 teams, and Anorthosis Famagusta FC won the championship. Also Apollon Limassol made their debut as a team.

League standings

Results

References
Cyprus - List of final tables (RSSSF)

Cypriot First Division seasons
Cypriot First Division, 1957-58
1